Herman Doumnan (born 25 September 1982) is a Chadian professional football player. He has made nine appearances for the Chad national football team.

See also
 List of Chad international footballers

References

External links
 

1982 births
Living people
Chadian footballers
Chad international footballers
Place of birth missing (living people)
Association football midfielders